Moscow Elegy is a 1988 documentary film directed by Alexander Sokurov, about the later life and death of Soviet Russian filmmaker Andrei Tarkovsky. The film was originally intended to mark the 50th birthday of Tarkovsky in 1982, which would have been before his death. Controversy with Soviet authorities about the film's style and content led to significant delays in the production.

Production
The film consists mostly of Sokurov's narration over stock footage from Tarkovsky's films Mirror, Nostalghia, Voyage in Time, and The Sacrifice, as well as footage of Tarkovsky shot during production for The Sacrifice. Some footage was supplied by Chris Marker. Sokurov also shot footage of various houses and apartments where Tarkovsky had lived. With the exception of some of the archival footage, the film is entirely in black and white. Sokurov and the crew had scheduled a total of 12 days for the entire production.

Reception
The film was first screened at Dom Kino in Moscow in 1987 on Tarkovsky's birthday, and many Russian filmmakers and actors (for example Alexander Kaidonovsky) strongly disliked it.

Similar documentaries
Several dozen other documentaries about Andrei Tarkovsky have been produced. Most notable are Voyage in Time by Tonino Guerra and Andrei Tarkovsky himself, One Day in the Life of Andrei Arsenevich by Chris Marker, The Recall by Tarkovsky's son Andrei Jr., and Regi Andrej Tarkovskij by Michal Leszczylowski, the editor of Tarkovsky's The Sacrifice. Tarkovsky has also been featured in numerous documentaries about the history of cinema or the craft and art of filmmaking.

References

External links

1988 films
1988 in the Soviet Union
Andrei Tarkovsky
Documentary films about film directors and producers
Films directed by Alexander Sokurov
1980s Russian-language films
Soviet documentary films
1988 documentary films